The Federal Correctional Institution, Terminal Island (FCI Terminal Island) is a low-security United States federal prison for male inmates in Los Angeles,  California. It is operated by the Federal Bureau of Prisons, a division of the United States Department of Justice.

FCI Terminal Island is located at the entrance to Los Angeles Harbor, between San Pedro and Long Beach.

History

The prison was opened at the southern end of Terminal Island, adjacent to a Coast Guard base, on June 1, 1938, with 610 male, and 40 female prisoners. It consisted of a central quadrangle surrounded by three cell blocks and cost $2 million to construct. In 1942, the U.S. Navy took control of the prison for use as a receiving station and later as a barracks for court-martialed prisoners. The facility was deactivated by the Navy in 1950 and later turned over to the state of California for use as a medical and psychiatric institution.

The state returned control to the U.S. Bureau of Prisons in 1955 for conversion into a low-to-medium security federal prison. The prison was mixed-sex, with female prisoners housed separately, until 1977, when overcrowding led to the transfer of the women to the federal prison in Dublin, California. The prison was given increased barbed wire and armed guards in the early 1980s in an effort to dispel the facility's "Club Fed" image. A corruption scandal rocked the prison in the early 1980s, resulting in the indictment of six employees on charges of bribes, cover-ups, marijuana sales to inmates, and other corruption. Those indicted included Charles DeSordi, the prison's chief investigator of crimes, the highest-ranking federal prison official ever to be indicted.

In 2020, the COVID-19 coronavirus had infected almost half of the inmate population. With 9 deaths and over 681 inmates having been tested positive for the coronavirus, the prison was said to have one of the worst and most cases of any federal lockup in the country and more than all California state prisons combined.

Notable inmates (prior to 1982)
† Inmates released prior to 1982 are not listed on the Federal Bureau of Prisons website.

Notable inmates (since 1982)

Facility and services
All inmates are expected to maintain a regular job assignment, unless medically exempted. Many job assignments are controlled through a performance pay system, which provides monetary payment for work. UNICOR has a separate pay scale. Institutional maintenance jobs are usually the first assignment for new inmates. These might include assignments to Food Service, as a unit orderly, or in a maintenance shop. However, a significant number of inmate jobs are available in the Federal Prison Industries. There is a waiting list for factory employment.

UNICOR employs and trains inmates through the operation of, and earnings from, the metal factory that produces high-quality metal products for the Federal government. inmates must obtain a GED for grade advancement and must participate in the Financial Responsibility Program (if required) to be employed in UNICOR. Federal Prison Industries, a U.S. government employment program, has a shop at FCI Terminal Island that specializes in repairing, refurbishing, and reconditioning furniture, office equipment, tires, and other government property.

Education
All inmates are required to obtain a GED before their release. College courses are offered through Coastline Community College.

See also
 List of United States federal prisons
 Federal Bureau of Prisons
 Incarceration in the United States

References

External links
 FCI Terminal Island

Federal Correctional Institutions in the United States
Prisons in California
Government buildings in Los Angeles
Terminal Island
1938 establishments in California
Buildings and structures in Los Angeles